Grosse Pointe South High School is a public high school of state and national historical significance serving the Detroit suburb of Grosse Pointe. Originally known as Grosse Pointe High School when it opened in 1928, the school adopted its current name in 1968 after the newly established Grosse Pointe North High School began accepting students.

Communities served and feeder patterns
The school serves the following municipalities: almost all of Grosse Pointe Farms, and all of Grosse Pointe (city) and Grosse Pointe Park.

Elementary schools feeding into GPSHS include all of the zones of Defer, Kerby, Maire, Père Gabriel Richard, and Trombly. All of the boundaries of Pierce Middle School and most of the boundary of Brownell Middle School coincides with that of GPSHS.

Academics

In 2009, Newsweek ranked Grosse Pointe South in the top 2% of high school in the United States. In 2010, Newsweek ranked Grosse Pointe South 920th nationally (fifth in Michigan).

Martin Luther King Jr. visit and speech
Grosse Pointe High School hosted a speech by Martin Luther King Jr. on March 14, 1968, when 2,700 people gathered in the gymnasium to hear a speech entitled "The Other America" three weeks before his assassination.

To honor the 50th anniversary of the event the Grosse Pointe News partnered with the Grosse Pointe Board of REALTORS® in submitting an application for a historic site marker to be placed near the one previously installed on campus. The marker, which was approved by the Michigan Historical Commission on July 27, 2018, was paid for by a grant from the National Association of Realtors®.

Extracurricular activities

Athletics

As of 2010, the school offers 15 varsity sports teams for boys and 18 varsity sports teams for girls.  These sports include baseball, basketball, competitive cheer, crew, cross country, field hockey, figure skating, football, golf, gymnastics, ice hockey, lacrosse, sailing, soccer, softball, swimming and diving, synchronized swimming, tennis, track and field, volleyball, and wrestling. Grosse Pointe South competes in the Macomb Area Conference (MAC), under the regulation of the Michigan High School Athletic Association (MHSAA).

Tennis
The boys' tennis team won the class A state championship in 1945 and 1946 and tied with Monroe High School in 1947.  The girls' tennis team won the state championship every year from 1976 to 1986 (Tying in 1976,1977,1982 and 1985), 2008, 2012, and 2014.

Performing arts
Pointe Players is Grosse Pointe South's student theater organization.

GPSHS has four show choirs: Pointe Singers varsity choir, Serendipity junior varsity, Rhapsody in Blue traditional concert choir, and the extracurricular female-only Tower Belles. Pointe Singers, Serendipity, and Rhapsody in Blue are competitive, with Pointe Singers winning a national-level competition in 2019.

Robotics
The South Sun Devils is the solar car team, competing since 2013 in The Solar Car Challenge in Dallas, Texas.  The team fundraised, designed, built, and raced their street-legal car on Texas Motor Speedway followed by a road test challenge.

Notable alumni
 Ayokay — producer and DJ
Terrence Berg - Federal District Court Judge, Eastern District of Michigan
 Scott Boman — Libertarian politician in Michigan
 Tony Fadell — Engineer, inventor, entrepreneur, and investor. Co-founder of Nest. Key figure in the development of the iPod and iPhone.
 Reid Fragel - Former NFL player
 Chris Getz — Former MLB second baseman with the Toronto Blue Jays, Kansas City Royals, and Chicago White Sox
 Edward Herrmann — Actor and narrator known for his role as Richard Gilmore on Gilmore Girls and his voice work for PBS and History
 Alexander Koch — Actor known for his role as James "Junior" Rennie on Under the Dome
 Lisa LoCicero — Actress known for her role as Olivia Falconeri on General Hospital
 John 5 (John Lowery) — Guitarist with Rob Zombie and Marilyn Manson
 Mike Murphy — Republican political consultant and NBC News and MSNBC contributor
 Quinn XCII — singer and songwriter
 Brianne Nadeau - Councilmember on the Council of the District of Columbia
 Catie DeLoof - American Olympian bronze medalist in the 4x100 meter freestyle

See also

References

External links

The Grosse Pointe Public School System Web Page
The Grosse Pointe Historical Society (MLK Visit)
The Grosse Pointe South Athletic Booster Club

Public high schools in Michigan
Schools in Wayne County, Michigan
Educational institutions established in 1927
Historic district contributing properties in Michigan
National Register of Historic Places in Wayne County, Michigan
School buildings on the National Register of Historic Places in Michigan
1927 establishments in Michigan
Historic districts on the National Register of Historic Places in Michigan